Tempest is the 35th studio album by American singer-songwriter Bob Dylan, released on September 10, 2012, by Columbia Records. The album was recorded at Jackson Browne's Groove Masters Studios in Santa Monica, California. Dylan wrote all of the songs himself with the exception of "Duquesne Whistle", which he co-wrote with longtime Grateful Dead associate Robert Hunter.

Tempest  was released to acclaim from music critics, who praised its traditional music influences and Dylan's dark lyrics. The album peaked at number 3 on the Billboard 200. Tempest was Dylan's last album to feature original material until his 2020 album Rough and Rowdy Ways.

Background and recording
The album was recorded from January to March 2012 and was produced by Dylan under the pseudonym Jack Frost. In addition to Dylan's Never Ending Tour band, the sessions featured contributions from Los Lobos' David Hidalgo. News of the album first leaked when Hidalgo spoke about it in an interview with The Aspen Times:

The sessions were engineered by Scott Litt, a producer best known for his work with R.E.M., Nirvana, and The Replacements. According to a 2012 article in The New Yorker, "Litt’s biggest contribution to Tempest may have been a prized pair of old Neumann microphones that he owns, worth twenty-five thousand dollars or so each. They are 'omnidirectional'; you can set one up in the middle of the room and record many musicians at once, in the round. It was an unorthodox, old-fashioned approach, but Dylan apparently liked what the mikes picked up. 'It created a soundscape, and he kind of fit over it', Litt said. Dylan’s voice stood out. Litt didn’t mess with it. Listeners will not dispute that few tricks were deployed to enhance it".

Artwork
The cover art for Tempest incorporates a dark red duotone photograph of a statue located at the base of the Pallas-Athene Fountain in front of the Austrian Parliament Building in Vienna. The statue is one of four figures on the intermediate platform of the fountain bowl personifying the main rivers of Austria-Hungary: the Danube, the Inn, the Elbe, and the Moldau. The figure shown on the album cover represents the Moldau. The sculpture was created by Carl Kundmann between 1893 and 1902 based on architect Theophil Hansen's original plans. The photograph was taken by Alexander Längauer from his Shutterstock  portfolio, and the package was designed by Coco Shinomiya. As with all Dylan albums of the past 15 years, the packaging features minimal credits and no printed lyrics.
The deluxe limited edition CD includes a 60-page notebook of rare vintage magazines with Bob Dylan on the front cover. The covers are from the collections of Magne Karlstad and Oddbjørn Saltnes.

Release
Tempest was released on September 10, 2012, in the United Kingdom and September 11 in the United States. It was announced for release on July 17, 2012, through a press release on Dylan's official web site. The release was issued as a CD, an LP, and as a digital download through online retailers. Various pre-order packages were available from Dylan's official online store including a combined CD/MP3 download of the album, an LP-only version, and two CD/LP bundles including a signature Bob Dylan Hohner harmonica in the different keys and an exclusive 11"x17" poster. A segment of "Early Roman Kings" was featured in a Cinemax commercial for the TV series Strike Back: Vengeance, and "Scarlet Town" was featured during the end credits of the first two episodes, both of which aired on August 17, 2012. "Early Roman Kings" and "Duquesne Whistle", written by Dylan and the latter with Robert Hunter, were released as the album's singles, the latter accompanied by a music video; the video was directed by Nash Edgerton, who had directed videos for two previous Dylan songs. Rolling Stone wrote that the video "initially seems like a Charlie Chaplin-inspired bit of light comedy", but that it takes a "shockingly dark turn".

The album's title initially spurred rumors that it would be Dylan's final album, based on its similarity to the title of Shakespeare's final play. Dylan responded: "Shakespeare's last play was called The Tempest. It was not called just plain 'Tempest'. The name of my record is just plain Tempest. It's two different titles".

Critical reception

Tempest was widely acclaimed by contemporary music critics. At Metacritic, which assigns a normalized rating out of 100 to reviews from mainstream critics, the album received an average score of 83, which indicates "universal acclaim", based on 31 reviews. The album is often considered, along with 1997's "comeback album", Time Out of Mind, 2001's "Love and Theft", and 2006's Modern Times, as part of a string of critically acclaimed albums in late-Dylan's catalogue. Some even found it surpassing those other albums, such as Mojo Magazine, who in their review of Tempest opined, "Tempest is Dylan's best musical album of this century, a vibrant maximising of strict rules and the savaged-leather state of that voice". Likewise, Riboflavin of Tiny Mix Tapes felt that "Tempest's epic scale and grandeur makes his few previous albums look like short stories leading up to a great novel". Rob Brunner, reviewing the album for Entertainment Weekly, felt that "thirty-five albums in, Dylan remains as magical and mysterious as ever".

In his review in Rolling Stone magazine, Will Hermes gave the album five out of five stars, calling it "musically varied and full of curveballs" and "the single darkest record in Dylan's catalog". According to Hermes, the album draws upon elements common throughout Dylan's career—especially the last three albums—with music that is "built from traditional forms and drawing on eternal themes: love, struggle, death". Hermes continues:

Many critics praised the album for its dark lyrical nature and roots in "Old Weird America". David Edward expressed this in his review for Drowned in Sound stating, "The coherence of Tempest is the hypnotic key to its charm. Compressed together, the collection exudes a dark flow and a hidden, perilous depth." Likewise, in Magnet Magazine's review of Tempest, they felt that "Dylan has never been more deliberate or so overtly savage". Dougles Helesgrave likewise praised the album for its music sources and dark lyrics, stating:

In his review for American Songwriter, Jim Beviglia gave the album four and a half out of five stars, calling it "the kind of meaty offering that his most ardent fans desire most". Beviglia notes that the ambitious three-song run concluding the album "should silence any doubts, if they exist, that Dylan is still at the top of his game". "Tin Angel" tells a story of a lovers' triangle that turns into a "Shakespearean body pile, providing plenty of fodder for Dylanologists looking for symbols and hidden meanings". The title track, according to Breviglia, may be a metaphor for how mankind is "headed unknowingly toward an unfortunate fate" with Dylan examining how people react—"some nobly, some horribly, when put to the ultimate test". The closing track, "Roll on John", veers between biographical elements and Lennon song lyrics, presenting what Beviglia calls the "oft-overlooked soft side of Dylan" that is truly touching". Beviglia concludes:

In his review in The Daily Telegraph, Neil McCormick called the album "among his best ever". According to McCormick, the songs on Tempest reveal a Dylan "genuinely fired up by the possibilities of language" and that the entire album "resounds with snappy jokes and dark ruminations, vivid sketches and philosophical asides". McCormick continued:

In his review for the Chicago Tribune, Greg Kot gave the album three and a half out of four stars, calling it "an inspired mix of blood and bawdiness". Kot called Dylan a "masterful storyteller, by turns murderous, mischievous and tender, sometimes all at once". In his review on Uncut, Allan Jones gave the album ten out of ten stars, calling it "the most far-reaching, provocative and transfixing album of Dylan’s later career. Nothing about it suggests a swansong, adios or fond adieu". In his review in The Gazette, Bernard Perusse gave the album five out of five stars, noting that it "ranks among Dylan's darker works, largely because it has the highest death toll". In his review in the Tampa Bay Times, Sean Daly gave the album an "A" rating, calling it "breathtaking but bleak" and a "mesmerizing record".

In her review for USA Today, Edna Gundersen gave the album four out of four stars, calling it "brilliant". According to Gundersen, Dylan's "peerless powers as a wordplay wizard and consummate storyteller" have not diminished with age, and that Tempest continues in the vein of his recent albums, "steeped in tradition and bent toward blues". Dylan's voice is ideal for these songs, Gundersen noted, whether he's describing a triple murder-suicide in "Tin Angel" or vilifying modern robber barons in "Early Roman Kings". Beneath the humor and mayhem Dylan layers "sexual and political metaphors and bigger truths about human nature, twisted morals, fate and mortality".

Others found the album over-hyped. In his review in The Guardian, Alexis Petridis gave the album four out of five stars but downplayed some of the superlatives offered by other reviewers who have compared Tempest to some of Dylan's finest work. In his consumer guide for MSN Music, Robert Christgau gave the album a "B+", offering a similar complaint about the "autohype machine" and how some of the reviews were overly positive. Christgau was also unimpressed with the title track and the closing number, which "aim higher with dubious-to-disgraceful results".

Rolling Stone named it the fourth best album of 2012. The magazine also named the song "Pay in Blood" the 9th best song of 2012. The album placed seventh in The Wires annual critics' poll.

Track listing

Personnel
 Bob Dylan – guitar, piano, vocals, production

Additional musicians
 Tony Garnier – bass guitar
 Donnie Herron – steel guitar, banjo, violin, mandolin
 David Hidalgo – guitar, accordion, violin
 Stu Kimball – guitar
 George G. Receli – drums
 Charlie Sexton – guitar

Technical personnel
 William Claxton – back cover photography
 Scott Litt – engineering, recording, mixing
 Dana Nielsen – recording, mixing
 John Shearer – booklet photography
 Coco Shinomiya – package design
 Shutterstock / A. Längauer – front cover photography
 Albert Watson – additional booklet photography

Release history

Charts

Weekly charts

Year-end charts

Certifications

References

External links
Lyrics at Bob Dylan's official website
Chords at Dylanchords

2012 albums
Albums produced by Bob Dylan
Albums recorded at Groove Masters Studios
Bob Dylan albums
Columbia Records albums
Murder ballads